In mathematics, the Rauzy fractal is a fractal set associated with the Tribonacci substitution

 

It was studied in 1981 by Gérard Rauzy,  with the idea of generalizing the dynamic properties of the Fibonacci morphism.
That fractal set can be generalized to other maps over a 3-letter alphabet, generating other fractal sets with interesting properties, such as periodic tiling of the plane and self-similarity in three homothetic parts.

Definitions

Tribonacci word
It is an example of a morphic word.
Starting from 1, the Tribonacci words are:
 
 
 
 
 

Fractal construction

Consider, now, the space  with cartesian coordinates (x,y,z). 
The Rauzy fractal is constructed this way:

1) Interpret the sequence of letters of the infinite Tribonacci word as a sequence of unitary vectors of the space, with the following rules (1 = direction x, 2 = direction y, 3 = direction z).

2) Then, build a "stair" by tracing the points reached by this sequence of vectors (see figure). For example, the first points are:
 
 
 
 
 
etc...Every point can be colored according to the corresponding letter, to stress the self-similarity property.

3) Then, project those points on the contracting plane (plane orthogonal to the main direction of propagation of the points, none of those projected points escape to infinity).

Properties 
 Stable under exchanging pieces. We can obtain the same set by exchanging the place of the pieces.
 Connected and simply connected. Has no hole.
 Tiles the plane periodically, by translation.
 The matrix of the Tribonacci map has  as its characteristic polynomial.

Variants and generalization 
For any unimodular substitution of Pisot type, which verifies a coincidence condition (apparently always verified), one can construct a similar set called "Rauzy fractal of the map". They all display self-similarity and generate, for the examples below, a periodic tiling of the plane.

See also

 List of fractals

References

External links

 Topological properties of Rauzy fractals
 Substitutions, Rauzy fractals and tilings, Anne Siegel, 2009
 Rauzy fractals for free group automorphisms, 2006
 Pisot Substitutions and Rauzy fractals
 Rauzy fractals
Numberphile video about Rauzy fractals and Tribonacci numbers

Fractals